Bill Conner was a Washington State Senator, and also served as Speaker of the House for a time. He was a Republican and ran for Lt. Gov of WA, but was defeated.

Conner was a good friend of the famous journalist, Edward R. Murrow. His brother, Lacey Murrow, was a pall bearer at Bill Conner's funeral.

His parents were John S. Conner and Louisa (Seigfreid) Ann Conner. In 1869, John bought the trading post on the Swinomish Channel. He named it La Conner, in honor of his wife, Louisa.William Wallace Conner (November 7, 1882 – August 9, 1938) was an American politician in the state of Washington. He served in the Washington House of Representatives and Washington State Senate. He was Speaker of the House from 1915 to 1917.

References

1882 births
1938 deaths
Republican Party members of the Washington House of Representatives
20th-century American politicians
Republican Party Washington (state) state senators